The 2022 CONCACAF W Championship Group A was one of the two groups in the group stage of the 2022 CONCACAF W Championship, held from 4–11 July 2022 in Mexico. The teams in this group were Haiti, Jamaica, hosts Mexico, and the United States. The top two teams qualified for the knockout stage and the 2023 FIFA Women's World Cup, while the third-placed team qualified for the 2023 FIFA Women's World Cup repêchage.

Teams

Standings

Matches
All times are local, CDT (UTC−5).

United States vs Haiti

Mexico vs Jamaica

Jamaica vs United States

Haiti vs Mexico

Jamaica vs Haiti

United States vs Mexico

Discipline

Fair play points were used as tiebreakers in the group if the overall and head-to-head records of teams were tied. These are calculated based on yellow and red cards received in all group matches as follows:

 first yellow card: minus 1 point;
 indirect red card (second yellow card): minus 3 points;
 direct red card: minus 4 points;
 yellow card and direct red card: minus 5 points;

References